LH Aviation was a French aircraft manufacturing company, founded in 2004 and located in Melun-Villaroche. It was the developer of the LH-10 Ellipse.

Background 
The company was created in 2004 by Sebastien Lefebvre.

The LH-10 is a two-seater plane made of carbon fiber. It has multiple versions including automated and training planes. The plane was shown at the 2009 Le Bourget Paris Air Show.

Finance and Strategy 
The company was placed in recovery in 2018, and judicial liquidation began in September 2019. 1.

Key dates 
 May 2004: LH Aviation created.
 September 2007: First flight of the LH-10 prototype at the Avia International Airshow.
 March 2008: Joined the Aerospace Cluster Activity at Melun-Villaroche.
 July 2008: Attendance at Farnborough Airshow.
 June 2010: Financial and operational backing from Aeronautic Investment Fund Magellan Industries.
 June 2009, 2011, 2013: Participation in the 49th, 50th and 51st Paris Air Shows.
 October 2011: First formation: Saget Promotion Official delivery of the first two surveillance airplanes.
 August 2012: First flight of the LH-10 Ellipse Surveillance Advanced version.
 May 2013: First rocket launch performed from the LH-10 Ellipse.
 April 2014: Set up of the Moroccan subsidiary.
 December 2014: Use of the LH-10 by the French border police.
 January 2015: Creation of the Explorair 45.
 February 2015: Creation of the outsourcing department.
 21 October 2018: judicial liquidation

Products

LH-10 Ellipse 
The LH-10 Ellipse is for training and pilot training; it has a tandem configuration and a glass cockpit.

LH-10 Guardian 
The LH-10 Guardian is intended for surveillance missions.

LH-10 Elfe 
The LH-10 Elfe is a military aircraft with an airborne collision avoidance system.

LH-D 
The LH-D is an unmanned aerial vehicle made from carbon fiber. It has an OPV option.

References

External links 
 LH Aviation
 LH Aviation in India

Aircraft manufacturers of France
Companies based in Île-de-France